Clayton is a St. Louis MetroLink station. This at-grade station is located in the median of Forest Park Parkway between South Central Avenue and South Meramec Avenue, and serves the Clayton Central Business District, the St. Louis County Government Complex and area residents. Public parking is available in the attached county garage. However, this parking is not supplied by Metro, therefore charges may apply.

In 2004, Metro's Arts in Transit program commissioned the work Oasis by Catherine Woods for installation in the adjacent MetroBus transfer center. The panels of heat-strengthened, laminated glass are inspired by the four basic alchemical elements; earth, air, fire, and water. Also incorporated into the design is a fifth element based on the idea of good fortune.  This concept takes the form of four aluminum panels suspended alongside the glass pieces. They are pierced with abstract silhouettes inspired by symbols of good luck, including the horseshoe, wishbone, and four-leaf clover, as well as symbols from Peruvian, Chinese, and African cultures.

In 2008, the Arts in Transit program commissioned a work for the MetroLink station. Titled Grandfather Clocks and created by Carol Fleming, the glazed ceramic sculpture is reminiscent of the old, regal railroad clocks.

Station layout
This station is accessible via a pedestrian bridge, stairs, and an elevator. All bus connections are located in the adjacent Clayton MetroBus Center, which is accessible by elevator or stairs from the second level of the garage.

References

External links
 St. Louis Metro
 Former Clayton Rock Island Station (Clayton History Society)

MetroLink stations in St. Louis County, Missouri
Railway stations in the United States opened in 2006
Blue Line (St. Louis MetroLink)